Christian Worship: HYMNAL is the most recent hymnal authorized by the Wisconsin Evangelical Lutheran Synod (WELS). It was published in 2021 by Northwestern Publishing House, the official publisher of the WELS, and intended to replace Christian Worship: A Lutheran Hymnal. The WELS Hymnal Project Executive Committee began preparations for the hymnal in 2013; the project chairman was Jon Zabell and the project director was Michael Schultz.

Editions
In addition to the pew edition, several auxiliary books are available:

Core Volumes:

 Christian Worship: Hymnal
 Christian Worship: Accompaniment for Hymns
 Christian Worship: Accompaniment for Services

Expanded Resources

 Christian Worship: Psalter
 Christian Worship: Accompaniment for the Psalter
 Christian Worship: Altar Book
 Christian Worship: Agenda

Support Resources

 Christian Worship: Foundations
 Christian Worship: Musicians’ Manual
 Christian Worship: Guidebook
 Our Worth to Him: Devotions for Christian Worship

Preaching Resources

 Commentary on the Propers, Year A
 Commentary on the Propers, Year B
 Commentary on the Propers, Year C

Digital

 Musician's Resource
 Service Builder

Christian Worship: Service Builder

The hymnal offers an application called Christian Worship: Service Builder to plan worship and produce service folders or slide presentations for use during worship. The worship planners have the options to choose a day from the lectionary calendar, choose an order of service, customized liturgical options and hymns.

See also 
 List of English-language hymnals by denomination

References

External links 

 Official site

Lutheran hymnals
21st-century Christian texts
Wisconsin Evangelical Lutheran Synod